Tania Mouraud (born January 2, 1942, in Paris) is a contemporary French video artist and photographer.

Early life 
An autodidact, Tania Mouraud began her artistic career when young with Initiation rooms, spaces dedicated to introspection. In the 1970s, her work combined art and philosophy through an analytical and intellectual approach, at the time based primarily on words, and later on their typography.

During the same period, she continued to grow her series of photographs. In the late 1990s, she created her first videos. The themes of anguish and responsibility in the world are the basis of her videos and draw inspiration from her life that has been marked by mourning; "... In my artistic work, from the beginning, this obsession is really something fundamentally intimate that I share with the public."

Working in the video field has encouraged Tania Mouraud to radicalize her work through sound. After some concerts with the group Unité de Production she founded in 2002, Tania Mouraud embarked on live solo performances. Her video installations, including Ad Infinitum (2008) or Ad Nauseam (2014) and her collaboration with the Institut de recherche et coordination acoustique/musique (Ircam) marked a turning point in her work.

March 4, 2015, marks the debut of Tania Mouraud. A Retrospective. This is the first major monographic exhibition of the artist and was shown at the Centre Pompidou-Metz. This retrospective will be accompanied by nine other exhibitions in Metz in nine different places like the Regional Contemporary Art Fund of Lorraine (Frac Lorraine) and at the Galerie d'Exposition de l'Arsenal, creating a veritable journey through the city.

Biography

A cosmopolitan youth 

Tania Mouraud was born in Paris on January 2, 1942. She is the daughter of Martine Mouraud, journalist, publicist turned businesswoman, and writer. Her Romanian-born father, Marcel Mouraud, was a lawyer and collector of modern art. Both her parents were engaged in the Résistance.

She was exposed to art at an early age by her family environment. She lived in England and then in Germany, where she discovered the most avant-garde of artistic forms. She took influence from interacting with members of the group Zero, Beuys, John Cage, Gregory Corso, John Coltrane, and she befriended Gotthard Graubner and Reiner Ruthenbeck.

In the late 1960s, she lived in New York, where she met Dennis Oppenheim, and came into contact with the New York art scene.

Her first exhibition took place in 1966 at the Zunini gallery in Paris where she exhibited her Peintures médicales. "If my painting is intentionally schematic it is because I want to escape the pathos in the search of precision. I like that which is clear. Feelings are dangerous; the object is defined, reassuring. If one day I decide to paint the human figure, it will be as an object. "

In 1968, after returning from Documenta IV, Tania Mouraud publicly burned all of her paintings.

Initiation Rooms 

In 1968, Tania Mouraud created her first environments, called "Initiation Rooms". It is composed of glossy white spaces which combine to bring oneself toward introspection. Understanding the space in a psychosensory fashion creates perceptions of self-awareness. These environments are preceded musical performances by Pran Nath, Ann Riley and Terry Riley and La Monte Young and Marian Zazeela.

Tania Mouraud considers that these spaces are like a room added to our apartments: "An extra space for an extra soul" says Pierre Restany. Tania Mouraud followed a mathematical logic curriculum at Paris 8 University, then leaving for India in Kerala for six years. She still spends six months a year there.

The Work of Art as an analytical proposition 

In 1975, Tania Mouraud created in situ installations called "Art Spaces" in which short phrases, written on plastic construction sheeting the size of the wall, question the conditions of visual perception and lead the viewer to a vertiginous awareness from where he can see the depth of what he is doing.

Tania Mouraud continued this theme when she founded the group TRANS with Thierry Kuntzel then with Jon Gibson throughout the installations. Tania Mouraud then exhibited at PS1 in New York where she met Dara Birnbaum and Dan Graham. That same year she began teaching at the Regional School of plastic expression in Tourcoing France.

During this period, she began her famous Wall Paintings which were huge black painted letters that were stretched, straight, and very close together to the point of almost being illegible. They form a word or sometimes a phrase, such as "I Have a Dream". In 1989, "WYSIWYG" (What you see is what you get) was exhibited at the BPI of the Centre Georges-Pompidou where "the first of the Wall Paintings of Tania Mouraud concealed the slogan of a well-known brand of computer beneath its lofty appearance".

While she displayed her Wall Paintings series within the art school where she teaches, Tania Mouraud transmitted her vision of the responsibility of the artist facing history: "With this exhibition, I hear students ask the same question I ask myself: what does it mean to be an artist in '92? In 1992, when there are three million people unemployed in a manner seemingly excluding them from society, and that we see the reappearance of the specter of racism? Then there was the phrase, "I have a dream" written in strongly elongated and somewhat illegible lettering, but there will always be someone to decipher them. I speak for that person. It's a secret. "

She exhibits in many art centers in France, England, Canada, and the United States.

Writings 

Tania Mouraud has been working on the malleability and plasticity of writings since the 1960s.
For her, it is a system of representation, with its highlights and invisibilities.

The Photo-texts (1971 - 1973), the Plastics (1972 - 1990), the Mandala (1972-1974) or the Kairos performance (1978) question perception, reading, the way in which language conceals reality and the limits of language.

This research continues with the Wallpaintings since 1989, which require a particular attention to be read, but also with the exploded writings (2012-2017).

In Tania Mouraud's work, we find a taste for a mutual translation of words and images. The Dream series (2005) exposes the quote "I have a dream", translated into 25 languages. It reflects the rapid shift that writing can make to drawing when it cannot be read. The writing becomes a line, a pictorial element.

It is the same with the counter-forms of the letters that the artist explores, in particular with City Performance n°1 (1977), the series of Words (1988), that of Black Continent (1990-1991), that of Black Power (1988-1992) and the piece Alea 718 (1989).

This last artwork uses a computer program to establish a unique composition, which the artist wants to free from patriarchal pictorial canons thanks to the element of chance allowed by the process. This taste for programming is also put to work with the Mots-Mêlés (2017-2021), which hide poems or opera excerpts behind black flat tints.

Her artist's books, as FlashS''' (2020), confirm this work of the word and the sign as plastic manifestations.

 Photography 

In the mid-1980s, various photographic series began emerging, including Made in Palace, composed of black and white photos taken during "gay parties" at a Parisian club showing turbulent and multisensory spaces in blurry images. For the artist, there is a connection between painting and photography. Other series appear until 1992, consisting of pictures of kitsch objects in different places.

In 2008, continuing with her photographic paintings, Tania Mouraud presented the new series "Borderland", displaying a reflection of landscapes of "round balers" of straw.  Other series she created include Rubato, created on rubber tree plantations in Kerala. Désastre centers on the gaps in forests created by deforestation or Balafres showing quarries in Germany.

 Videos and Installations 

For the artist, the practice of "the sequential image" has long been set aside but it was during the 1990s that Tania Mouraud gradually became interested in video. "I have become accustomed to walking with a camcorder and, little by little, the idea has emerged." It was the 2000s that marked a turning point for the artist where video became an important part of her work.

Among the main creations:
 "Sightseeing" 2002. A foggy winter landscape, shot through a misty window, unfolds before our eyes, escorted by the incisive air of a klezmer clarinet. For seven minutes the road is an anguished climb to a stop, where finally, in front, a path firmly leads our gaze to a place where we will not approach. We then see that it is the concentration camp Natzweiler-Struthof, in Alsace. "The memory then falsely induces us to the illusion of a train journey, while signs of a car trip are present in the image. "
 "La Curée", 2003. Hunting dogs slowly and sensually devour raw meat. "This film is an ode to life. It is an image of violence, but in reality, when you look, it is the skin, the hair, it is a choreography of the body ... The dogs are happy because this is their reward. They do not seem mean. This is perhaps the violence of eroticism ... "
 "Le verger", 2003. Images of flowers in vibrant colors alternate with images of war at a pace difficult to follow and in a heavy and metallic air, punctuated by harrowing cries. Le Verger was immediately exhibited at the Fonds régional d'art contemporain (Frac) in Lower Normandy.
 "La Fabrique", 2006. Video installations, filmed in India, which will be exhibited in several cities in France including the Foire Internationale d'Art Contemporain (Fiac) curated by the Dominique Fiat gallery, and also in California, Canada and finally in St. Petersburg. "The faces of 108 male and female workers on multiple monitors and the deafening sound of working looms create in the visitor a sensation of mechanical work. The dislocated bodies of these workers are the engine of this strange fabric ..."
 "Roaming", 2009. Video installation on display at the musée de la chasse et de la nature in Paris.

In 2008, a press release for the opening of Roaming, Borderland we read that this creation "is considered a testimony of her exceptional mastery of the art of video. Shot in black and white, the dark undergrowth of images and watchtowers are reworked and almost become abstract, and then are accompanied by an acoustic creation that accentuates their dramatic character. Captured at twilight and magnified by the work of the artist, these pieces of nature become metaphors for the human condition, violence, loneliness and death ".
 "Ad Infinitum" 2009. Huge video installation in the chapel of the oratory of Nantes. Projected inside the chapel, the filmed whales almost appear and disappear into a dark and cloudy water. For Tania Mouraud, "The whole piece evokes the plea of the living, the groaning of nature that begs us to stop the ecological carnage as well as the moans of our inner child as we face the unknown, the loss of communication and of love. " "The sequence of Ad Infinitum is a choreography"
 "Once upon a time", 2012. Gigantic projection on the City Hall of Toronto during the Nuit Blanche in 2012. "Once Upon a Time shows the mechanistic universe attacking the living, and we sense, at the moment the saw cuts into the tree, that the saw enters our own body."
 "Ad Nauseam" 2014. Huge video triptych at the Musée d'art contemporain du Val-de-Marne. | Projected in a huge room, three side-by-side videos show a book recycling plant. Videos are devoid of any human presence, we see a series of machines that pile and then grind thousands of books. The installation is accompanied by a sound creation by Tania Mouraud done in collaboration with IRCAM. A random droning sound taken from the sounds of grinding machines is constantly played.

 Sound and Sound Performances 

In 2002, Tania Mouraud founded the musical experimentation group " Unité de Production  " with Christian Atabekian, Ruben Garcia, Pierre Petit, Cyprien Quairiat, Marie-Odile Sambourg, Sylvain Souque and Baptiste Vandeweydeveldt.

Then it follows a musical course via the Internet at the Berklee College of Music. Since J.I.T. in Brest (2008), she performed live solo improvisations accompanying her videos at the Béton Salon in Paris, and during the same year at the Centre d'art passerelle in Brest, musée de la chasse et de la nature in Paris and at the Lieu unique in Nantes, during the Nuit Blanche 2012 at Gare d'Austerlitz as well as the Musée d'Art Contemporain du Val-de-Marne (Mac/Val) during her exhibition of Ad Nauseam in 2014.

 A Social Art 

In 1977, Tania Mouraud organized her first "City performance": 54 4x3 meter billboards on which the word "NI" is written and posted in several Parisian arrondissements. "Absolute negation, a denial, all the more disturbing, when it does not say what it is targeting. This seems to be resistance to the usual forms of advertising discourse, and the market sphere in whose service it is placed" writes Arnauld Pierre.

In 1993, Tania Mouraud directed "Apartment 374", an ongoing intervention in an apartment of the l'Unité d'habitation by Le Corbusier in Firminy. The codified signs of nomads are sandblasted onto the windows of the living room, turning it into a "welcoming home". For the duration of the exhibition, croissants were distributed free to the public.

In 1996, she scattered 4000 small medals marked with the word love on the streets of New York, at the Fondation Cartier and at the Mirabelle Festival in Metz.

That same year, she exhibited Le Silence des héros for the Occupied Territories exhibition in Zweibrücken, Germany. Along the walls of the room, red and black flags are rolled up and placed against the wall.

 Permanent Installations 
 WYSIWYG (1989–2007)
– Wall painting, Bibliothèque publique d'information, Centre Georges-Pompidou, Paris, France
 La Curée (2004)
– Installation vidéo, Musée de la Chasse et de la Nature, château de Chambord, France
 HCYS? (2005)
– Impression sur bâche, collection FRAC, Metz, France
 DDDDLH (2006–2008)
– Bas-relief, commande du Conseil général du Val-de-Marne dans le cadre du Percent for Art, collège Fernande-Flagon, Valenton, France

Exhibitions

Personal Exhibitions (non-exhaustive list)

 2022 : [DIRE], Ceysson & Bénétière Gallery, Lyon
 2022 : Shmues, curator Perrine Lacroix, LABF15, espace d’art contemporain, Lyon
 2021 : MEZZO FORTE, Ceysson & Bénétière Gallery, Luxembourg
 2021 : De Natura, Chateau de Chaumont-sur-Loire
 2020 : Dream, Sorbonne Art Gallery, Paris
 2019 : Tania Mouraud, Ecriture(s), Hangar 107, Rouen
 2018 : Tania Mouraud, everything must have an ending except my love for you, Tauves, France
 2017 : Who's the enemy?, curator Elodie Stroecken, catalogue, Lieu D'art La Mouche, Béziers, France 
 2016 : Tania Mouraud: Otnot, Gallery Eastwards Prospectus, Bucharest, Romania (catalogue), CTJLFDM, 91 billboards across Romania, Bucharest, Iasi, Sibiu, Cluj, Bacau, Pitesti
 2015 : Tania Mouraud, Une Rétrospective, Centre Georges Pompidou Metz
 2014 : Exhausted laughters, musée d'art moderne de Saint-Etienne
 2014 : Ad Nauseam, au musée d'art contemporain du Val-de-Marne (MAC/VAL)
 2012 : deuxlarmessontsuspenduesàmesyeux, Collège des Bernardins, Paris, France
 2011 : J’entends les trains depuis toujours / I keep hearing the trains for ever, curators Marie-Claire Groeninck and Jean-Michel Rabate, Slought Foundation, Kimmel center and Art Alliance, Philadelphia, USA
 2010 : Une pièce de plus, Centre de création contemporaine de Tours|Centre de création contemporaine, Tours, France
 2015 : Tania Mouraud, Une Rétrospective, Centre Pompidou-Metz
 2014 : Exhausted laughters, Musée d'art moderne et contemporain de Saint-Étienne
 2014 : Ad Nauseam, au Musée d'art contemporain du Val-de-Marne (MAC/VAL)
 2010 : Une pièce de plus, Centre de création contemporaine de Tours, Centre de création contemporaine, Tours, France
 2010 : No Name, Slought Foundation, Philadelphie
 2009 : Ad Infinitum, Musée des Beaux-Arts de Nantes, France
 2009 : Borderland, galerie Dominique Fiat, Paris, France
 2008 : Roaming, Musée de la Chasse et de la Nature, Paris, France
 2008 : J.I.T, Just in Time, La Passerelle, Brest, France
 2008 : Back from India, Performance sonore projection vidéo, Bétonsalon, Paris, France
 2006 : La Fabrique, CSUF Grand Central Art Center, Santa Ana, Californie, USA
 2006 : Façade, Nuit Blanche, musée de la chasse et de la nature, Paris, France
 2005 : City Performance N°1, FRAC Lorraine, Metz, France
 2004 : Du pain et des jeux, galerie Arc en Ciel, Liévin, France
 2004 : Centre d'Art Sallaumines, France
 2004 : Tania Mouraud, Centre d'Arts Plastiques de Saint-Fons, France
 2003 : Le Verger, FRAC Basse Normandie, Caen, France
 2003 : La Box, Bourges, France
 2001 : Impressions, Centre d'art Le Parvis, Ibos, France
 2001 : Décorations, Le Triangle, Rennes, France
 2001 : Tania Mouraud, Patricia Faure Gallery, Los Angeles, Californie
 2000 : Route # 1,13 Quai Voltaire, Caisse des dépôts et consignations, Paris
 2000 : A collection, California State University, Long Beach
 1999 : Made in Palace, Galerie Rabouan Moussion, Paris
 1999 : Hammer project n°1 : Tania Mouraud, Los Angeles, USA
 1999 : World Signs IV, Leeds City Museum, Stoke-on-Trent, England
 1998 : World Signs III, Maidstone Museum & Art Gallery, Kent, Kent
 1998 : Cityscape, Galerie Fernand Léger, Ivry-sur-Seine, France
 1998 : World signs II, Riverside Studios, Londres
 1997 : World Signs I, Herbert Art Gallery and Museum, Canterbury, Kent, GB
 1997 : Tania Mouraud, Musées du château des Rohan à Saverne, France
 1997 : Tania Mouraud, Kent Institute of Art & Design, Canterbury, GB
 1996 : DIEUCOMPTELESLARMESDESFEMMES, Le Quartier, Quimper, France
 1996 : Ballades de Tania à la Fête de la Mirabelle, Metz, France
 1994 : De la Décoration à la Décoration, Gemeentemuseum Den Haag, Arnhem, Hollande
 1992 : Fait main, École des Beaux-arts, Tourcoing, France
 1992 : Faire art, Galerie Gabrielle Maubrie, Paris
 1992 : The Power Plant, Toronto, Canada
 1990 : Centre Loisirs et Rencontres, Clermont-Ferrand, France
 1990 : Galerie Gabrielle Maubrie, Paris
 1989 : BLACK POWER ici là, CAC Pablo Neruda, Corbeil-Essonnes, France
 1989 : Tania Mouraud : 1969–1989, La Criée, Rennes, France
 1989 : BLACK POWER, galerie De Lege Ruimte, Bruges, France
 1989 : BLACK POWER, "vu ou lu", Galerie Gabrielle Maubrie, Paris
 1988 : Words, Riverside Studios, Londres
 1987 : Garden Shooting, Espace Photographique Contretype, Bruxelles
 1986 : Vitrines, musée de la photographie, Charleroi, Belgique
 1986 : Garden Shooting, Maison de la Culture, Amiens, France
 1983 : Ah! Paris, galerie Samia Saouma, Paris
 1983 : Vitrines, Maison du Temps Libre, Marne-la-Vallée, France
 1983 : Schaufenster in Paris, galerie Wilde, Cologne
 1980 : City Performance n°2, 60 affiches, Lyon, France
 1978 : Kairos (performance), Franklin Furnace, New York
 1978 : City Performance n°1, 54 affiches, Paris
 1977 : Art Space n°5, special project, PSI, New York
 1976 : Art Space n°1, 2, 3, Chez Malabar et Cunégonde, Nice, France
 1975 : Galerie 33 (rue Campagne Première), Paris
 1974 : Galerie Yellow Now, Liège (catalogue)
 1973 : ARC 2, (musique Jon Gibson), Musée d'Art Moderne de la Ville de Paris
 1972 : Galerie Françoise Lambert, Milan
 1971 : Galerie Rive Droite, Paris
 1971 : Galerie LP 200, Caliche Ligure
 1971 : Galerie Ben doute de tout, Nice
 1971 : Galerie Apollinaire, Milan
 1971 : Galerie LP 220 (avec les musiciens : La Monte Young, Terry Riley, Pandit Pran Nath), Turin
 1968 : Galerie Rive Droite (musique Éliane Radigue), Paris
 1966 : Galerie Mensch, Hambourg
 1966 : Galerie Zunini, Paris

Collective Exhibitions (non-exhaustive list)

 2022, Parisiennes Citoyennes ! 1789–2000, Carnavalet Museum, Paris
 2022, Double je, curator Alexandre Quoi, MAMC, Saint-Etienne
 2022, Pionnières, curator Patrice Joly, Zoo gallery, Nantes
 2022, Contente d'être aujourd’hui, curator Céline Melon Sibille, Claire Gastaud gallery
 2021, Elles font l’abstraction, Guggenheim Bilbao
 2021, L’Énigme autodidacte, curator Charlotte Laubard, Musée d’Art Moderne et Contemporain de Saint Etienne
 2021, Penser les possibles, curator Mehryl Levisse, Espace Balak, espace temporaire d'art contemporain, Charleville-Mézières
 2021, La chose mentale, des NFT à l’oeuvre, Festival accès)s( #21, Pau
 2021, Elles font l’abstraction, Centre Pompidou - Galerie 1
 2021, The Domino Effect, GAEP Gallery, Bucharest, Romania
 2021, ART = ACTION, une collaboration Act Up-Paris et MAC VAL
 2021, Le Goût du paysage, curator Laure Forlay, collection du FRAC Auvergne, halle aux bleds, Saint-Flour
 2020, Le vent se lève, MAC VAL, Vitry
 2020, "De franchir de la même façon les lignes d’horizons et des petites allées", Galerie Claire Gastaud, Clermont-Ferrand, France
 2020, Bye Bye Future! L'art de voyager dans le temps, Musée royal de Mariemont, Morlanwelz, Belgium
 2020, Paysages du XXIème siècle, Maison De l'Architecture de Poitiers
 2019, Festival Rose Beton - Tania Mouraud, Les Abattoirs, Toulouse
 2019, There are treasures everywhere - Jardin Rouge, foundation Montresso, Marrakech, Maroc
 2019, Defragmentation, ARBA, Bruxelles
 2019, Symbiotes, Eternal Gallery, Tours, France
 2019, «Once upon a Time», EAC Les Roches, Chambon-sur-Lignon, France
 2019, Jeux de Mots, Jeux d’écritures, MAMAC, Nice
 2019, PULSIONS, The 836 M Gallery February 11- March 5, 2019 - performance SfMa
 2019, Lignes de vies – Une exposition de légendes, MAC-VAL, Vitry, France, curator Frank Lamy (catalogue)
 2019, Gigantisme May 2019 - January 2021 Dunkerque, France.
 2019, Carnegie International, 57th edition, October 2018 - Carnegie Museum of Art, Pittsburg, Pennsylvania, US. curator: Ben Ogrodnik
 2019, festival VIDEOFORMES ! 2019 Chapelle de l'Hôpital Général, Clermont Ferrand curator : Gabriel V. Soucheyre
 2018, EXPERIENCE POMMERY #14 // L'ESPRIT SOUTERRAIN, Domaine Pommery, Reims, curator : Hugo Vitrani
 2018, Considérer le monde II, Musée d'art moderne et contemporain (MAM), Saint-Etienne Métropole, France
 2018, La science du désordre, curator Pierre Bendine-Boucar, A+Architecture, Montpellier, France
 2018, Everything we do is music, curator Shanay Jhaveri, Pasquart kunsthaus Centre d'art Biel/ Bienne, Switzerland
 2018, Art Conceptuel, curator Alexandre Quoi, Musée d'art moderne et contemporain de Saint- Etienne, France
 2018, Biennale Internationale Saint-Paul de Vence, France
 2018, LA LUMIÈRE NOIRE. Les traditions hermétiques dans l’art depuis les années 1950,
curator Enrique Juncosa, CCCB, Centre de Cultura contemporanea de Barcelona, Spain
 2018, Considérer le monde : Narrative Art Collections du Musée, curator Alexandre Quoi,
Musée d'art moderne et contemporain de Saint-Etienne, France
 2018, Images en lutte (1968-1974) La culture visuelle de l'extreme gauche, curator Eric de Chassey, Palais des Beaux-Arts, Paris, France
 2017, Contemporary Istanbul, Gallery Eastwards Prospectus, Istanbul, Turkey
 2017, Paysages du XXIe siècle, que fabriquons-nous aujourd’hui ?, exposition itinérante CAUE
de Haute-Savoie, Annecy, Angoulême, Nantes, Angers, Lyon, Genève, France & Switzerland
 2016, Observations sonores, Musée Gassendi, Dignes-les-eaux, France
 2016, J'ai des doutes. Est-ce que vous en avez?, curator Julie Crenn, Galerie Claire Gastaud, Clermont Ferrand, France
 2016, La peinture à l'huile c'est bien difficile, Frac Languedoc Roussillon, Montpellier, France
 2015, Experience N°9 Exhibition, Musée des Beaux Arts, Tours, France
 2015, Il était une fois, Palais de l'Archevêché, Arles, France
 2015, Un genre humain, curator Claude Leveque, Palais Jacques Coeur, Bourges, France
 2015, Tous les chemins mènent à Schengen, FRAC Lorraine, Metz, France
 2015, Terrain sensible, College Frederic et Irene Joliot-Curie, Vivonne, France
 2015, Game over, Galerie EC'ARTS, ESPE de Bretagne, Rennes, France
 2014, Carte blanche à l'artothèque, Musée des Beaux-Arts, Angers, France
 2014, Machines désirantes, Frac BN, Caen, France
 2014, Populaire, populaire #3, mois de la photo OFF 2014, 6B, St Denis, France
 2014, ALEA #17 & #18, WIP Villette, France
 2013, Histoires de géographie, curator Catherine Elkar, Frac Bretagne, Rennes, France (catalogue)
 2013, Une spiritualité au féminin, curator Madeleine Blondel, Dominique Dendraël, Musée d’Art Sacré, Dijon, France (catalogue)
 2013, Dinard, l’Amour Atomique, curator Ashok Adiceam, Festival de Dinard, France (catalogue)
 2013, A distance, Plateforme d’art de Muret, France
 2013, Le jour d’avant, Domaine départemental de la Garenne Lemot, Gétigné—Clysson, France
 2013, EMOI & MOI, MAC VAL, Villejuif, France
 2013, Honey, I Rearranged The Collection, Philippe Cohen Collection, Passage de Retz, Paris, France
 2013, Honey, I Rearranged The Collection, Philippe Cohen Collection, Musée d'Art de Petah Tikva, Tel Aviv, Israel (Catalogue)
 2013, Paysage cosa mentale, Le nouveau pittoresque, curator Christine Ollier, Maison Nationale des
 2013, Artistes, Nogent sur Marne, France (catalogue)
 2012, Once Upon a Time, video installation, Nuit Blanche, Toronto City Hall, Toronto, Canada
 2012, Vivement demain, nouvel accrochage de la collection du Mac/Val, Vitry-sur-Seine, France
 2012, La Plasticité du Langage, Fondation Hyppocrène, Paris, France
 2012, Songeries végétales, Domaine de Chaumont-sur-Loire, France
 2012, Contre Nature/Les fictions d’un promeneur d’aujourd’hui, Musée départemental, Beauvais, France
 2012, Sunset, Frac Poitou Charente, Site de Linazay, France
 2012, Parlessoirsbleusd’été, j’iraidanslessentiers, (A. Rimbaud, sensation,1870), Biennale d’art contemporain Chemin-d’Art, Halle aux Bleds, St Flour, France
 2012, Bêtes Off, La Conciergerie, Paris, France
 2012, Carte Blanche à Tania Mouraud, Théâtre, Auxerre, France
 2012, Tracts!, Sans niveau ni mètre, Cabinet du livre d’artiste, Rennes, France
 2012, Portraits/paysages : la transformation des genres, Musée des Beaux-Arts de Nantes, France (catalogue)
 2012, Quelle histoire ?!, Château de Foix, Musée départemental de l’Ariège, France
 2012, FormesBrèves, autre,25, curator Anja Isabel Schneider, FRAC, Lorraine, France in partnership with, MARCO, Vigo, Spain
 2011, Elle était une fois, Eglise des Cordeliers, Gourdon, France
 2011, Architectures/Dessins/Utopies, curator Ruxandra Balaci, MNAC, Bucarest, Roumania
 2011, Plug-in II, Musée de l’Ile d’Oléron, St Pierre d’Oléron, France
 2011, Black Should Bleed To Edge, Ecole Régionale des Beaux Arts, Rouen, France
 2011, Si loin, si proche, FRAC Bretagne, L’imagerie, Lannion, France
 2011, Cherries On The Boat, Fondation Hippocrène, Paris, France (catalogue)
 2011, Jamais le même fleuve, collections privées de photographies (catalogue)
 2011, Le moins du monde, Frac Lorraine, Metz, France
 2011, Décor et Installations, curator Françoise Ducros, Galerie des Gobelins, Paris, Galerie nationale de la tapisserie, Beauvais, France
 2010, Paysage 2 : imminence de la catastrophe, Espace Croix-Baragnon, Toulouse, France
 2010, A l’ombre d’un doute, FRAC Lorraine, Metz, France
 2010, La mémoire et l’oubli, Maxime Deyts's high school, Bailleul, France
 2010, En mai, fais ce qu’il te plaît! Curator Juliette Laffon, Musée Bourdelle, Paris, France (catalogue)
 2010, Les promesses du passé, 1950-2010 : Une histoire discontinue de l’art dans l’ex- Europe de l’Est, section : sources/documents/archives -Galerie 33, Centre Georges Pompidou, Paris, France
 2010, Border Zones: Newart acrosscultures, Museum of Anthropology at the University of British Columbia, Vancouver, Canada
 2010, elles@centrepompidou, Centre Georges Pompidou, Paris, France (catalogue)
 2010, Paysage-Video, Dialogue avec les collections#2, Musée d’Art de Toulon, France (catalogue)
 2010, Vénus changée en document, Les Abattoirs, Toulouse, France
First Ural Industrial Biennale of contemporary arts 2010, Special projects, National Center
for Contemporary Arts, Ekaterinburg, Russia (catalogue)
 2009 : elles@pompidou, Centre Pompidou, Paris, France
 2009 : Universal Code, The Power Plant, Toronto, Canada
 2009 : Blind Chance & Possible Futures, Nieuwe Vide, Haarlem, Pays-Bas
 2008 : Regarde de tous tes yeux, regarde – L'art contemporain de Georges Perec, Musée des Beaux-Arts de Nantes; Musée des Beaux-Arts de Dole, France
 2008 : Stratégies de l'histoire / Stratégies de l'art – 5e Biennale de Goumri, Académie des Beaux-Arts de Goumri, Arménie Opera, an artists film selection, Tate Britain, Londres
 2008 : Œuvres en papier, Galerie Dominique Fiat, Paris, France
 2007 : !REVOLUTION?, Kunsthalle, Budapest, Hongrie
 2007 : Sublime Objects / Sublimes Objets / Obiecte Sublime, Mnac Bucarest, Roumanie
 2007 : Periskop, La Passerelle, Brest, France
 2007 : Le Quartier fête ses 16 ans, Le Quartier, Quimper, France
 2006 : Videogramma, Centre d'arts plastiques, Saint-Fons, France
 2006 : Chassez le naturel..., Domaine national de Chambord, France
 2006 : Verdunklung/Darkening, Kunsthaus, Stuttgart, Allemagne, commissaire : Arianne Müller
 2006 : La Force de l'Art, Grand Palais, Paris, commissaire : Anne Tronche
 2006 : Collection permanente, musée d'art moderne de la ville de Paris, France
 2005 : Marie-Madeleine contemporaine, hospice Comtesse, Lille, France
 2005 : La photographie à l'épreuve, musée d'art moderne, Saint-Étienne, France
 2005 : Best of, galerie Dominique Fiat, Paris
 2005 : Doute et Hypothèse, Galerie Aponia, Villiers-sur-Marne, France
 2005 : Chassez le naturel..., château de Chambord, France
 2005 : Ah Dieu que la guerre est jolie !, FRAC Basse-Normandie, France
 2005 : Le chant rythmique de l'esprit, Espace de l'Art concret, Mouans Sartoux, France, commissariat Dominique Boudou
 2005 : Wonder women, FRAC Lorraine, Metz, France
 2005 : Le corps dans l'art contemporain, théâtre de Privas, France
 2005 : Climats, cyclothymie des paysages, Vassivière, France
 2005 : Forever, Passage de Retz, Paris
 2005 : Dessins d'artistes, l'écoleIUFM, Paris
 2005 : Collection Vicky Remy, musée de Saint-Étienne, France
 2004 : Art et grandeur nature, La Courneuve, France
 2004 : Marie Madeleine, musée des arts de Toulon, France
 2002 : Les années 70, musée d'art contemporain, CAPC, Bordeaux, France
 2002 : Sans commune mesure, musée d'art moderne Lille Métropole, Villeneuve-d'Ascq, France
 2000 : Voyager à la verticale, Maison de la Villette-Parc de la Villette, Paris
 1998 : Tania Mouraud et Niek Van de Steeg, Théâtre des Arts, Cergy-Pontoise, France
 1997 : Amours, Fondation Cartier pour l'art contemporain, Paris
 1997 : Sous le manteau, Galerie Thaddeus Ropac, Paris
 1997 : XIe bourse d'art monumental, Credac, Ivry, France
 1997 : Vraiment: féminisme et art, Le Magasin, Centre d'art de Grenoble, France
 1997 : Petite fiction les pieds dans l'eau, FRAC Languedoc-Roussillon, France
 1997 :Collection Camille: signatures de femmes, Épinal, France
 1997 :From One Point To Another, Atelier Soardi, Nice, France
 1997 :Flash, Power Plant, Toronto, Canada
 1997 :Cinq ans d’acquisition, FRAC Alsace, Strasbourg, France
 1997 :Histoires de blanc et noir, Prague, République tchèque
 1997 :Teen Tonic, FRAC Poitou Charentes, Angoulême, France
 1997 :Crossroad, City Museum, Art Gallery, Stoke-on-Trent, Angleterre
 1996 : Wall Drawings ‘96: B. McGee, T. Mouraud, M. Dean Veca, The Drawing Center, New York
 1996 : Histoires de Blanc et Noir, curator Serge Lemoine, musée de Grenoble, France
 1995 : Femininmasculin, MNAM, Centre Georges-Pompidou, Paris, New York
 1995 : Passions Privées, ARC2, musée d'art moderne de la ville de Paris
 1995 : Collections/collection, musée de Saint-Étienne, France
 1995 : Feux terrestres, Centre d'art contemporain, Sète, France
 1994 : L'appartement de Ghislain-Mollet Vieville, MAMCO, Genève, Suisse
 1994 : Logo non-Logo, Thread Waxing Space, New York
 1993 : La Donation Vicky Remy I et II, musée d'art moderne, Saint-Étienne, France
 1990 : Art & Pub, MNAM, Centre Georges-Pompidou, Paris
 1983 : Arc 2 : 1973/1983, musée d'art moderne de la ville de Paris
 1976 : Identités : Identifications, CAPC Bordeaux, France
 1976 : Ambiente/Arte, Biennale de Venise, Italie
 1972 : 60/72, 12 ans d'art contemporain en France, Grand Palais, Paris
 1970 : Art Concept from Europe, Galerie Bonino, New York City

 Writings on Tania Mouraud 

Monographs

 2022, [Dire], catalogue, LABF15, Lyon, Perrine Lacroix, Cécile Renoult
 2019, Tania Mouraud, Ecriture(s), catalogue, Le Hangar 107, Rouen, Nicolas Couturieux, Mathias Barthel, Cécile Renoult
 2018, Tania Mouraud, Everything must have an ending except my love for you, catalogue, Tauves, Perrine Le Querrec
 2017, Tania Mouraud, Who's the enemy ?, catalogue, La Mouche, lieu d’art contemporain, Béziers, France.
 2016, OTNOT, Eastwards Prospectus, text by Elodie Stroecken, Bucharest, Romania
 2016, TANIA MOURAUD, Eastwards Prospectus
 2016, Everyday ogres at Visual Arts Centre - The University of Texas at Austin, USA
 2015, Tania Mouraud, Une Rétrospective, catalogue, Centre Pompidou-Metz
 2014, Tania Mouraud, Ad Nauseam, catalogue, Mac/Val
 2014, Tania Mouraud, exhausted laughters, catalogue, musée d'art moderne et contemporain de Saint-Étienne
 2004, Tania Mouraud, textes de Arnauld Pierre, Éditions Flammarion

Others
 2015 :
"Tania Mouraud: Engagée volontairement", Piguet Philippe, L'Oeil n°678, avril 2015

"Tania Mouraud, méditation spirituelle", Anne Tronche, Artpress N°420, 21 mars 2015

"Tania Mouraud, la fureur et la rage", Emmanuelle Lequeux, LeMonde, 9 janvier 2015

"Tania Mouraud. Une rétrospective", entretien avec Philippe Piguet, Art Absolument n°64, 12 mars 2015
 2009 :
Tania Mouraud, On the roads, collection "L'art en écrit", éditions Jannink, Paris
 2008 :
«Entretien avec Tania Mouraud, peintre autrement", Valérie Da Costa et Alain Berland, Particules, n°20, juin – juillet – août

«Transactions mitigées au Grand Palais", Le Monde, 28 octobre

«La Fiac crée un beau désordre à la Cour carrée et trop de sagesse au Grand Palais", Philippe DAGEN, Le Monde, 25 octobre

«Der Clown traegt Rot, Weiss, Blau und Sterne", Angelika Heinick, Frankfuerter Allgemeine Zeitung (Allemagne), 25 octobre

«Fiac frileuse Slick rieuse", Connaissance des Arts, 24 octobre

«Fiac : choses vues", http://lunettesrouges.blog.lemonde.fr/, 24 octobre

«Investir avec art dans le filon jeune à la Fiac», Béatrice de Rochebouët, Le Figaro, 24 octobre

«Le nec plus... ultra contemporain", L'Œil, octobre

«Les créateurs font leur show à la FIAC", Roxana Azimi, Le Monde, 15 octobre

«Tania Mouraud", Made in Street (Pologne), n°3, février
 2007 :
«Harmonieux Chaos", AD, Gaelle Cotton, octobre

«Paris Photo", Blog Lunettes rouges, 17 novembre
 2006 :
«Carte Blanche: Tania Mouraud», Archistorm, juillet-août

«La France de l'Art, Expo 7 : "Ecart", entretien avec Anne Tronche", Beaux Arts Magazine, mai

«Or donc", www.jowebzine.com, Perrine Le Querrec, janvier

«Or donc", www.paris-art.com, Christine André, janvier

«Tania Mouraud", www.paris-art.com, Pierre-Evariste Douaire, janvier

"Les propositions radicales de Tania Mouraud", Connaissance des Arts, Damien Sausset, février

"Graphisme Typographie Histoire", Roxane Jubert, préface de Serge Lemoine, éd. Flammarion, p. 373 et 415, février

"Galerie Dominique Fiat, Tania Mouraud", Le Monde, Harry Bellet, 11 février

Reviews, art press, Valérie Da Costa, mars
 2005 :
«Wonder Woman, impertinence au FRAC", Le Républicain lorrain, 8 février

"Wonder Woman", Le Jeudi, 24 février

"Femmes en œuvre", Le Républicain lorrain, 6 mars

"Cinglantes super nanas", Est républicain, 6 mars

www.art-themagazine.com, juin

Le Monde, Harry Bellet, 4 août

"L'esprit de Géométrie", Le Figaro Magazine, 3 décembre

Beaux Arts Magazine, décembre
 2004 :
«Tania Mouraud : le son et le silence", Jean-Yves Bosseur, Parade, février

"Tania Mouraud, Jean-Marc Huitorel", art press, janvier
 1997 :
«From One Point To Another", Atelier Soardi, Nice

"Collections/Collection", musée d'art moderne, Saint-Étienne»

"Sous le manteau", Galerie Thaddeus Ropac, Paris
 1996 :
«Tania Mouraud", Catalogue de l'exposition DIEUCOMPTELESLARMESDESFEMMES

Le Quartier Quimper textes de Dominique Abensour et Robert Fleck.

"Tania Mouraud", Arts Info n° 78 Délégation aux Arts Plastiques Paris

"Tania Mouraud" : les bannières, et la rose", Dominique Boudou Beaux Arts, n°142, Paris

"Mouraud compte les larmes de Dieu", Hervé Gauville, Libération 24/25 février, Paris

Agenda international de l'art 1996, Les éditions internationales de l'art, Paris

"La caisse des dépôts dépose ses caisses", Élisabeth Lebovici, 2 Libération, 2 fév.

"Saint-Étienne, lieu d'excellence de l'art contemporain", Le Monde, 13/01

"Wall drawings '96", catalogue de l'exposition, The Drawing Center, New York

"Drawings dare to compete..." Dinitia Smith, The New York Times, Jan 15, New York

"Ballade artistique à Soho", Pascale Richard, France Amérique, New York

"Monument et Modernité", Espace Electra, Paris

"Histoires de Blanc et Noir", musée de Grenoble, Stiftung für Konkrete Kunst, Reutlingen, Allemagne
 1995 :
"Crossroad", catalogue de l'exposition, Kent Institute of Art and Design, Canterbury

"Territoires occupés", catalogue de l'exposition, FRAC Lorraine

"Art minimal et conceptuel", Ghislain Mollet-Viéville, Skira, Paris

"Avant garde walk a Venezia", catalogue de l'exposition

"Lieux de passage Marseille", L'Observatoire n°4
"Chez l'un l'autre", catalogue de l'exposition, Paris édition Anton Weller

"Fragments d'un paysage amoureux", catalogue de l'exposition Actes sud

Bienale Venedig Ein Rundgang Wolfang Träger Kunstforum International n°131
 1994 :
«De la décoration à la décoration", catalogue de l'exposition, Gemeente Muséum Arnhem avec des textes de Mirjam Westonet et Michel Pastoureau

"De la décoration à la décoration", Irène Constandse Uit Arnhem, avril 1994, Arnhem

"Tania Mouraud remix", interview avec Ginette Lemaitre et Elein Fleiss, Paris Purple Prose, été

"Beats Pulsares", catalogue de la collection de la Caisse des Dépôts et Consignations Paris, texte de Guy Tortosa

Musée d'art moderne et contemporain, catalogue MAMCO, Genève

"Tania Mouraud", Zeggen zonder te zeggen Cornel Bierens, Hedendaagse

"Franse Kunst in Nederland", Association artistique d'action artistique France Kunst, avril 1994, p. 20

"One more night...Zu Tania Mouraud Meditationsraum", Pierre Restany in Meta 4 Radical Chic, Stuttgart, 1993, p 103-109

"Chez l'un l'autre 1", catalogue de l'exposition, Paris, Éditions Anton Weller

"Franse Kunst..." Wim van der Beek De Telegraph April 8, 1994, Hollande

"De Nulgraad van het Schilderen Janneke Wesseling", April 15, 1994, Hollande

"Politiek werk van Tania Mouraud", Zondagkraut April 3, 1994

Klei Duimpje in borstzak generaal Martin Peiterse De Gelderlander April 1, 1994, Nimègue

"Tania Mouraud... " Yvonne Jansen Apeldoornse Courant April 30, 1994, Arnhem

"Met een gasmasker... " Marianne Vermeijden, NCR, March 25, 1994, Amsterdam
 1993 :
«Tania Mouraud", catalogue de l'exposition Fait main, Tourcoing, ERSEP, texte de Guy Tortosa, entretien avec Anne Tronche

"Public & Privé", catalogue de l'exposition, Édimbourg, 1993, p 66

"Infi nito Silenzio", catalogue de l'exposition, CRAC FRAC Alsace, Françoise Ducros, p. n°30

"I have a dream" p. 46, Evelyne Durand p. 80, BLOC-NOTES n°2 printemps 93

"Woman Is Beautiful", Wassingue n°3, Lille

"Tania Mouraud, l'Art est public", Guy Tortosa, Unité Tania Mouraud Yves Aupetitallot, Omnibus,

Gazette trimestrielle sur l'Art contemporain, n°6, juin 1993

"La Donation Vicky Remy", catalogue de l'exposition, Saint-Étienne, p. 56

"Tania Mouraud : Ni ceci, ni cela", Sans Titre n°20, La Madeleine
 1992 :
«Génériques", Art Press n° 175, Paris

"Information Dienst", Kunstlerhauss, Stuttgart

"Tania Mouraud, Mots de formes", Élisabeth Lebovici, Libération 19/11/92

«Tania Mouraud, Fait Main", Art Presence n1, Pléneuf-Val-André

"The News" Brigitte Cornaud, Galerie Magazine International Édition, p. 9

"Tania Mouraud", catalogue de l'exposition, The Power Plant, Toronto, texte de Louise Dompierre, interview avec Ian Wallace

Dictionnaire de l'Art moderne et contemporain de Gérard Durozoi (Hazan)

"Tania Mouraud May celebrate the Power Plant " Artline

"Tania Mouraud : Apologie des Amateurs", entretien avec Vanina Costa, Kanal Europe

Contemporain n°2, avril-mai 1992

"Portraits d'une capitale de Daguerre à William Klein", collections photographiques du musée Carnavalet

Mois de la photo à Paris, Collections photographiques du musée Carnavalet, p. 199
 1991 :
«Portrait d'Artiste : Tania Mouraud", La Gazette des Historiens d'art, dossier l'Art et les Femmes, nov.-déc 91 n°7, Camille Morineau

"La Photographie dans les Collections de la Maison de la Culture", catalogue de l'exposition, Amiens
 1989 :
«Report from Paris I...", Tony Godfrey Art in America n°10, New York

"Tania Mouraud, Black Power", Catherine Kempeneers Opus International n°115, Paris

"Tania Mouraud, Au-delà de l'image", Mo Gourmelon le carreres, Arte Factum n°30, 1989, Anvers

"Tania Mouraud in De Lege Ruimte", Pro, Bruges

"There is no French Art", Nadine Descendre, Le Magasin PUBLIC n°4, Grenoble

"Tania Mouraud, Black Power, Ici, Là", Alain Leduc, Artension n°8, Rouen

"Tania Mouraud" Catherine Grout, art press, n°134, Paris
 1983 :
«Le lèche-vitrines de Tania Mouraud", Christian Caujolle Libération, November 2, 1983, Paris

"De l'avant-garde à l'avenir", Gilles de Bure, Vogue Hommes, octobre 1983 n°63, Paris

"Garden Shooting", Plages n°21, Paris

"Tania Mouraud", Anne Dagbert, Part Press n°76, Paris

"Vitrines", catalogue de l'exposition Les bénéfices d'un inventaire, Jean-François Chevrier, maison du Temps libre, Marne-la-Vallée

"Textographies", catalogue de l'exposition, centre culturel communal du Plessis-Robinson

"Tania Mouraud et Pierre Petit", Gérard Durozoy, Canalmanach, avril 1983, Paris

"Tania Mouraud..." Bernard Delage, Diagonal n°46, Paris

"Tania Mouraud", Dominique Carré, Les Nouvelles littéraires n°2880, Paris

"FRAC Poitou-Charentes, Premières Acquisitions", catalogue de la collection, Poitiers

"ARC 1973 1983", catalogue de l'exposition, musée d'art moderne de la ville de Paris, Paris

"Overlay", Lucy R. Lippard Pantheon Books, New York
 1982 :
«Traces d'elles", catalogue, maison de la Culture, Aulnay-sous-Bois
 1981 :
«Images Fabriquées", Elizabeth Couturier, art press, janvier 1981, Paris

"Typish Frau", Catalogue Bonner Kunstverein, Bonn
 1980 :
«Mouvements/Corps", France Photographie, Paris

"Mouvements/Corps", Catalogue Viviane Esders, Paris

"Images Fabriquées", Catalogue Viviane Esders, Paris

"Onze artistes européens et Lyon", Jacqueline Rozier, Le Journal, June 23, 1980, Lyon

"Lyon, Carrefour européen", Michel Nuridsany, Le Figaro July 18, 1980, Paris

"Europe 80", Catalogue ELAC, Lyon 1980

"Tania Mouraud ", Performance dans la ville", Xavier Girard, Cahiers de l'École sociologique interrogative n°1, 1980, Paris

"Paysage sonore urbain", Bernard Delage, Plan Construction, 1980, Paris
 1979 :
«estuale", le parole e le immagini", Flavio Caroli, Gabriele Mazzotta ed., Milano

"Words", Catalogue Bochum Museum, Bochum

"Les Femmes et l'Art contemporain", Christine Maurice, Encyclopedia Universalis, Paris

"Artitudes", François Pluchart, Catalogue Galerie d'Art contemporain des musées de Nice, Nice

"Words", Catalogue Palazzo Ducale, Gênes, 1979

"03 23 03", Catalogue Galeries nationales d'Art contemporain, Montréal

"Art actuel n°5", Skira Annuel, Weber S.A. éd., Genève

La Pratica Politica", Catalogue Galleria Civica, Modena
 1978 :
«City performance n°1", Bernard Blistène, Flash Art 80/81, Milan

"Occupation textuelle de Tania Mouraud", Le Monde, January 25, 1978, Paris

"Les "Ni" de Tania Mouraud", Nathalie Mei, Libération, Paris

"Ni", Georgina Oliver, The Paris Metro, 18/01/78, Paris

"Le Ni de Tania", Hélène Mathieu, Marie-Claire, Paris

"Ni, le cri de Tania dans la ville", Pierre Cabane, Le Matin, January 11, 1978, Paris

"Les affi ches en jeu", Xavier Girard, 34–44, université de Paris-VI, Paris

"City performance n°1", Xavier Girard, l'Humidité n°25, Paris

"Arte e communicazione diversa", Tra 4/5, Parme

"Arte e Pratica Politica", éd. Tra, Parma

"Focus", Catalogue Centre culturel du Marais, Paris

"Tania Mouraud", Arts plastiques enseignement, Paris

"From the Center, Feminist essays on women's art", Lucy R. Lippard, Ed. Dutton & Co, New York
 1977 :
Trans, + – 0, n°17, Genval-Lac

Ghislain Mollet-Viéville, Trans, + – 0, n°16, Genval-Lac

"Tania Mouraud", Flash Art, mai-juin 77, Milan

Trans, Info artitudes, janv. 77, Paris

Ghislain Mollet-Viéville, Vogue, avril 77, New York

Trans, Maïten bouisset, Quotidien de Paris, 15/16.1.77, Paris

Trans, J.J. Levêque, Quotidien de Paris, 13/1/77, Paris

"Tania Mouraud at PS1", John Perreault, [[The SoHo Weekly News]], 22/9/77, New York

"Contemporary Artists", Colyn Naylor, Hilmarton Manor Press, Calne (UK)

"Spaces, Heresies", New York
 1976 :
«The Pains and Pleasures of Rebirth : Women's body art", Lucy Lippard, Art in america n°3

"Ambiente/Arte", Germano Celant, Édition de la biennale de Venezia, Venezia

"Aspects de la photographie dans l'art contemporain", Carole Naggar, Zoom n°38, Paris

"Art spaces", Germano Celant, Studio International, septembre-octobre 1976, Londres
 1975 :
«Art, Action, Participation", Franck Popper, Studio Vista, Londres

"Les voyages de Tania Mouraud", Aline Dallier, Opus n°56, Paris
 1974 :
«Tania Mouraud", Liza Bear, Avalanche, New York
 1973 :
«Tania Mouraud : l'impuissance n'est pas mon fort", J.P. Ribes, Actuel, Paris

"Tania Mouraud à l'ARC", Geneviève Breerette, Le Monde, Paris
 1972 :
«Is name given to a form ?", François Pluchart, Artitudes, Paris
 1971 :
«Iniziazioni", Tomaso Trini, domus n°497, Milan

"L'expérience spirituelle", Bernard Borgeaud, Pariscope, n°146, Paris

"Tania Mouraud", Catherine Millet, Lettres françaises, Paris

"Les méditations de Mouraud", François Pluchart, Combat, Paris

"Là-haut sur la colline", Daniel Habrekorn, Actuel'' n°8, Paris

"Mouraud, Tania Mouraud", catalogue publié par LP220, Turin
 1970 :
«Tania Mouraud", Tomaso Trini, Flash Art, Rome

"L'Implicazione Negativa di Tania Mouraud ", Michele Perfetti, Corriere del Giorno, Milano

"Blanc jusqu'au vertige", Bernard Borgeaud, Pariscope n°95, Paris

"Tania Mouraud : Gagner sa mort", Paule Gauthier, Lettres françaises, Paris

"One more night...", Pierre Restany, Galerie des Arts n°85, Paris

References

External links 
 
 Tania Mouraud. A Retrospective at the Centre Pompidou-Metz
 Ad-Nauseam at the Mac/Val
 Modern Art Museum of Saint-Etienne
 Slought Foundation
 LeMonde
 ArtDaily website

1942 births
Living people
20th-century French women artists
21st-century French women artists
Artists from Paris
French conceptual artists
French people of Romanian descent
Women conceptual artists